In Australian rules football, if a player takes a mark or is awarded a free kick before the siren sounds to end a quarter, and the siren sounds before the player takes a set shot, the player is allowed to take the kick after the siren. Often, the result of this kick is of little consequence, but if the player is within range of goal, any score will count towards the final result.

The right to take a set shot after the final bell was enshrined in the Laws of the Game prior to the 1889 season; prior to this, the ball was declared dead (and any opportunity for a set shot lost) once the bell sounded.

Below is a list of occasions where game results have been decided by set shots taken after the final siren, a play similar to the buzzer-beater in basketball. These are highly memorable and often go down in football folklore.

VFL/AFL

Goal to win

Goal to draw

Behind to win

Behind to draw

Missed opportunities
A list of instances where a player had a shot at goal after the siren to win or draw the game but missed, resulting in a loss, or instances where a player has had a kick after the siren with scores level but failed to score.

AFL Women's

Goal to win

Missed opportunities
A list of instances where a player had a shot at goal after the siren to win or draw the game but missed, resulting in a loss, or instances where a player has had a kick after the siren with scores level but failed to score.

Other leagues

Goal to win

Goal to draw

Behind to win

Missed opportunities

Miscellaneous
There have been some cases of a kick after the siren which cannot be properly classified into one of the above tables due to extraordinary circumstances surrounding the outcomes of the games.

See also
 Fitzroy's Colin Benham's "in-off the small boy" goal (Lake Oval, 30 June 1934)
 Buzzer beater (basketball)
 Last-minute goal (soccer)
 List of Hail Mary passes in American football

Notes

References
 The Official statistical history of the AFL (annual publications)

Australian rules football-related lists
Australian Football League
Australian rules football terminology